Abu Jafar Mohammad Nasir Uddin aka A J M Nasir Uddin (born 1 January 1957) is a Bangladeshi politician and former Mayor of Chittagong City Corporation. He is also the vice president of Bangladesh Cricket Board.

Personal life 
Uddin was born on 1 January 1957 in Andarkilla, Chittagong. He completed his primary level education at Kadam Mubarak Primary school then completed S.S.C. in 1973 from Government Muslim High School. He completed H.S.C and his graduation at Chittagong College.

Career 
On 24 January 1993, a rally of Awami league led by Sheikh Hasina at Laldighi Maidan, Chittagong was attacked. After which a case was filed by Sufian Siddique, Bangladesh Chattra League leader, against 28 including Uddin. Bangladesh Police submitted the charge sheet in the case on 7 March 1993. Uddin was acquitted in the case on 23 July 2015.

Uddin submitted his nomination form to contest the mayoral election in Chittagong on 31 March 2015. He won on 30 April 2015 the election defeating the candidate of Bangladesh Nationalist Party Mohammad Manjur Alam. Bangladesh Nationalist Party called the vote rigged and boycotted it. A voter was threatened with three years imprisonment by a polling agent of Uddin saying that his vote had already been cast. In 2017, Uddin traded barbs with former mayor ABM Mohiuddin Chowdhury.

On 3 April 2019, Uddin slapped an engineer of National Housing Authority over land disputes regarding construction of sewage line between National Housing Authority and Chittagong City Corporation. On 28 October 2019, he forced Hasina Mohiuddin, the wife of the former Mayor of Chittagong ABM Mohiuddin Chowdhury, off the stage at a program of Awami League. He presented the Chittagong City Key to cricketer Shakib Al Hasan.

After Uddin's term as Mayor of Chittagong ended in 2020 he did not receive a nomination from Awami League for the future election. He blamed it on a "conspiracy". Awami League nominated Rezaul Karim Chowdhury to contest the Chittagong Mayoral election.

References 

1957 births
Living people
Mayors of Chattogram City Corporation
Awami League politicians
Government Muslim High School alumni
People from Chittagong
Bengali Muslims